Gorji-ye Sofla (also Romanized as Gorjī-ye Soflá; also known as Gorjī-ye Pā’īn) is a village in Tabadkan Rural District, in the Central District of Mashhad County, Razavi Khorasan Province, Iran. At the 2006 census, its population was 13,367, in 3,156 families.

References 

Populated places in Mashhad County